Park Jin-yong (born 17 November 1993 in Muju) is a South Korean luger.

Park competed at the 2014 Winter Olympics for South Korea. In the Doubles he competed with Cho Jung-myung, finishing 18th. He was also a part of the South Korean relay team, which finished 12th.

As of September 2014, Park's best performance at the FIL World Luge Championships is 23rd, in the 2013 Championships.

As of September 2014, Park's best Luge World Cup overall finish is 30th in 2013–14.

In 2023 He has partecipated to a Netflix reality competition "Physical:100" and conquered the 3rd position

Education
Muju Sulchon High School

References

External links
 

1993 births
Living people
South Korean male lugers
Lugers at the 2014 Winter Olympics
Lugers at the 2018 Winter Olympics
Lugers at the 2022 Winter Olympics
Olympic lugers of South Korea
Sportspeople from North Jeolla Province
20th-century South Korean people
21st-century South Korean people